Arianna Jeanette Romero Téllez (born 29 July 1992) is an American-born Mexican footballer who plays as a central defender or a fullback for Danish club HB Køge and for the Mexico national team.

Youth and collegiate career

Youth 
Romero did not participate in high school soccer at her alma mater, Willow Canyon High School. Instead, she played club soccer in Phoenix, Arizona for Sereno SC under Coach Dave Simeone. As a midfielder/defender, she helped the Sereno 92 Golden Eagles to eight state championships and three Region IV semifinal appearances. Additionally, her squad won 13 tournament titles and was a finalist at the Disney College Showcase. Individually, Romero was on the 2009 Arizona Olympic Development Program team that advanced to the semifinals of the Region IV Championship.

College
Romero attended the University of Nebraska where she played as a defender for the Cornhuskers. As a freshman, she started all 21 games and helped the team record five shutouts. She scored one goal and served three assists. Romero scored the first goal of her career in a match against Texas Tech University in October 2010. The game-winning goal helped the Cornhuskers win in overtime.

During her sophomore season, Romero started every game, scored one goal, and served two assists from the defensive line. On 2 September 2011, she scored her second career goal, served two assists and produced a career-high four points during the team's 6–0 defeat of the Arkansas Razorbacks.  As a junior, Romero missed the first five games of the 2012 season while playing for the Mexico National Under-20 Football Team at the FIFA U-20 Women's World Cup in Japan. After her return from the tournament, she started the final 15 games of the season and was part of a defensive unit that posted three shutouts during the season.

During her final year with the Huskers in 2013, Romero led the defensive line as a center back and helped the team record eight shutouts. She was named Second-Team NSCAA All-America, became the 12th Husker All-American, and was awarded Nebraska's NSCAA All-America award. The NSCAA All-Region First Team honoree and Big Ten Defender of the Year finished her career having started in all 77 of her career matches.

Club career 

In January 2014, Romero joined Seattle Reign FC as part of the 2014 NWSL Player Allocation. Later the same month, she was selected by expansion team, Houston Dash during the 2014 NWSL Expansion Draft.

On 2 December 2014, Romero was traded by Houston to the Washington Spirit.

In March 2016, she was acquired by Seattle Reign FC.

In October 2016, she joined Perth Glory as an international player.

Romero spent 2018 with Valur in the Úrvalsdeild kvenna in Iceland, she made 17 appearances with the team.

On 4 March 2019, Romero signed with the Houston Dash, returning to the team she had played with in 2014. On 17 June 2020, Romero was waived.

On 9 September 2020, Romero signed a short-term contract with the North Carolina Courage.

International career

After taking part in a training camp with the Mexico Under-20 National Team in July 2011, Romero was selected to be part of the Mexico National Team that competed at the CONCACAF Women's Olympic Qualifying Tournament in Vancouver, British Columbia, in January 2012.  She was also on the Mexico U-20 team that competed at the CONCACAF Championships in Panama City, Panama, in February 2012. Romero started all four of Mexico's games at the tournament, playing 360 minutes. She helped Mexico reach the quarterfinals for the second time at the 16-team tournament.

In the spring of 2013, Romero played in the Algarve Cup with the Mexico National team in Portugal. Mexico was one of 12 countries invited to the tournament and started in group play with Hungary, Wales and Portugal. Romero played in three of Mexico's four games, including a start against Wales during group play. Mexico won their group with a pair of wins over Hungary (1–0) and Portugal (3–0), which placed them in the seventh-place game at the tournament but lost to Denmark 3–0. Mexico played in the tournament for just the third time in tournament history and the first time since 2006.

Romero was one of four collegians to be called up for Mexico's women's nationally televised international friendly against the United States of America in Washington, D.C. at RFK Stadium on Tuesday, 3 Sept.. Romero started and played the entire match on a young back line for Mexico.

Personal life 
Romero is the daughter of José Romero and Carmen Téllez and has one brother, Cristian.

See also 
 List of Mexican Fútbol (soccer) athletes
 List of foreign W-League (Australia) players
 List of foreign NWSL players
 2012 CONCACAF Under-20 Women's Championship squads

References

External links 
 
 
 Profile  at Mexican Football Federation
 
 Houston Dash player profile
 Nebraska Cornhuskers bio
 

1992 births
Living people
Citizens of Mexico through descent
Mexican women's footballers
Women's association football central defenders
Women's association football fullbacks
Mexico women's international footballers
2015 FIFA Women's World Cup players
Pan American Games bronze medalists for Mexico
Pan American Games medalists in football
Footballers at the 2015 Pan American Games
Footballers at the 2019 Pan American Games
Arianna Romero
Arianna Romero
Arianna Romero
A-League Women players
Perth Glory FC (A-League Women) players
Toppserien players
Arianna Romero
Mexican expatriate women's footballers
Mexican expatriate sportspeople in Iceland
Expatriate women's footballers in Iceland
Mexican expatriate sportspeople in Australia
Expatriate women's soccer players in Australia
Mexican expatriate sportspeople in Norway
Expatriate women's footballers in Norway
American women's soccer players
Soccer players from Arizona
Sportspeople from Glendale, Arizona
American sportspeople of Mexican descent
Nebraska Cornhuskers women's soccer players
National Women's Soccer League players
Houston Dash players
North Carolina Courage players
American expatriate women's soccer players
American expatriate sportspeople in Iceland
American expatriate sportspeople in Australia
American expatriate sportspeople in Norway
Medalists at the 2015 Pan American Games
HB Køge (women) players
American expatriate sportspeople in Denmark
Expatriate women's footballers in Denmark